Hanno is a male given name.

People named Hanno include:
 Hanno Balitsch (born 1981), German footballer
 Hanno Behrens (born 1990), German footballer
 Hanno Dirksen (born 1991), South African rugby player
 Hanno Douschan (born 1989), Austrian snowboarder
 Hanno Drechsler (1931–2003), political scientist
 Hanno Essén (born 1948), Swedish physicist 
 Hanno Grossschmidt (born 1973), Estonian architect 
 Hanno Kitshoff (born 1984), South African rugby player
 Hanno Koffler (born 1980), German actor and musician
 Hanno Kompus (1890–1974), Estonian theatre director and art critic and historian
 Hanno Melzer, German rower
 Hanno Möttölä (born 1976), Finnish basketball player
 Hanno Pevkur (born 1977), Estonian politician
 Hanno Pöschl (born 1949), Austrian television actor
 Hanno Rund (1925–1993), German mathematician
 Hanno Selg (born 1932), Estonian pentathlete
 Hanno Teuteberg, South African naval officer

References

Given names
German masculine given names
Estonian masculine given names